The Ladies in the Green Hats (French: Ces dames aux chapeaux verts) is a 1949 French comedy film directed by Fernand Rivers and starring Colette Richard, Henri Guisol and Marguerite Pierry. It was the third adaptation of Germaine Acremant's novel of the same title to be made.

The film's sets were designed by art director René Renoux.

Cast
 Colette Richard as Arlette 
 Henri Guisol as Ulysse  
 Marguerite Pierry as Telcide  
 Jane Marken as Rosalie Davernis 
 Elisa Ruis as Marie  
 Mag-Avril as Jeanne  
 Jean Tissier as Dutoir  
 Christian Bertola as Jacques de Fleurville  
 Jean-Pierre Méry as Le frère d'Arlette 
 Pierre Juvenet 
 Nina Myral 
 Gabriel Sardet

References

Bibliography 
 Goble, Alan. The Complete Index to Literary Sources in Film. Walter de Gruyter, 1999.

External links 
 

1949 films
French comedy films
1949 comedy films
1940s French-language films
Films directed by Fernand Rivers
Films based on French novels
Remakes of French films
French black-and-white films
1940s French films